Wolf Island (Spanish: Isla Wolf) or Wenman Island is a small island in the Galápagos Islands and was named after the German geologist Theodor Wolf, who also has the volcano Wolf on Isabela Island named after him.

The island is remote from the main island group and has no permanent population. The Galápagos National Park does not allow landing on the island; however, it is a popular diving location. The group formed by Darwin Island and Wolf was previously known as Culpepper and Wenman.

Geology
Like its near neighbour Darwin Island, Wolf Island is upstream of the magma plume, in terms of plate movement, that forms the main Galápagos Islands and does not fit in with the formation of those islands. There are currently two theories on the formation of the lineament and therefore Wolf island:  the first is that magma rising from the mantle plume forming the main Galápagos Islands has been channelled towards the Galápagos Spreading Center; alternatively there has been a separate rise in magma caused by stress in the ocean lithosphere by a transform fault.

Wolf Island is the southerly island on the lineament.  The volcano that formed Wolf Island is now extinct with last eruptions believed to have been 900,000–1,600,000 years ago, meaning the last eruptions occurred before the last eruptions on Darwin Island.  The volcanic history of Wolf is complex, with at least two major eruptive phases.  The southern area of the island is formed from flat basalt layers from two eruptive phases, the second of which formed a caldera that has now eroded.  The lavas formed have been plagioclase ultraphyric basalts with large 4 cm crystals.  This chemical makeup is similar to those found in lavas from the northern Galápagos Islands.  The extent of the ultraphyric flows make up an unusually large percentage of the volume.  There is large variation in the composition of the lavas between eruptive phases, with later flows being depleted.

Wildlife
Wolf Island is part of the Galápagos National Park; however, it is not accessible to land visits.  Like its neighbour, Darwin, it is open to visits by scuba divers.  The marine life of Wolf Island includes: schooling hammerhead, Galápagos and occasionally whale sharks, as well as green turtles, manta rays and other pelagic fish.

Birdlife on the island is abundant with frigatebirds, red-footed boobies, and vampire finches.

References

External links
Satellite image of Wolf Island at Google

Islands of the Galápagos Islands
Seabird colonies